(10 April 1936 – 7 October 2019) was a Japanese illustrator, essayist, and film director.

Biography 
Wada was born in Osaka on 10 April 1936. He attended Tama Art University, where he won the Japan Advertising Art Award in 1957. As an illustrator, Wada drew many cartoons and caricatures for Shinichi Hoshi and Haruki Murakami. He designed more than 2,000 covers for the magazine Shūkan Bunshun from 1972 to 2017 and provided illustrations for the book review section of the Mainichi Shimbun from 1992 to 2018.

Being a passionate film fan, he started his career as a film director in 1984. He won the award for best director at the 31st Blue Ribbon Awards for Kaitō Ruby.

Since 1972, Wada was married to Remi Hirano, the granddaughter of Henry Pike Bowie. They had two sons: Sho and Ritsu. Their eldest son Sho is the guitarist and vocalist of Triceratops and is married to actress Juri Ueno.

Wada died on 7 October 2019 at the hospital in Tokyo. He was 83 years old. The cause of death was pneumonia.

Filmography
Mahjong hōrōki (1984)
Kaitō Ruby (1988)

References

External links
 Makoto Wada at J'Lit Books from Japan 

1936 births
2019 deaths
Deaths from pneumonia in Japan
Japanese illustrators
Japanese film directors
Japanese graphic designers
Japanese essayists
People from Osaka
Tama Art University alumni